The Chesapeake–Leopard affair was a naval engagement off the coast of Norfolk, Virginia, on June 22, 1807, between the British fourth-rate  and the American frigate . The crew of Leopard pursued, attacked, and boarded the American frigate, looking for deserters from the Royal Navy. Chesapeake was caught unprepared and after a short battle involving broadsides received from Leopard, the commander of Chesapeake, James Barron, surrendered his vessel to the British. Chesapeake had fired only one shot.

Four crew members were removed from the American vessel and were tried for desertion, one of whom was subsequently hanged. Chesapeake was allowed to return home, where James Barron was court martialed and relieved of command.

The Chesapeake–Leopard affair created an uproar among Americans. There were strident calls for war with Great Britain, but these quickly subsided. President Thomas Jefferson initially attempted to use this widespread bellicosity to diplomatically threaten the British government into settling the matter. The United States Congress backed away from armed conflict when British envoys showed no contrition for the Chesapeake affair, delivering proclamations reaffirming impressment. Jefferson's political failure to coerce Great Britain led him toward economic warfare: the Embargo of 1807.

Background

On June 22 of 1807, during the Napoleonic Wars, several British naval vessels were on duty on the North American Station, blockading two French third-rate warships in Chesapeake Bay. A number of Royal Navy seamen had deserted from their ships and local American authorities gave them sanctuary. Ratford had made himself conspicuous to British officers by shouting at them on the streets of Norfolk, Virginia.

Other deserters were reported to be at the Gosport Navy Yard, then commanded by Stephen Decatur. The consul claimed the men had enlisted in the U.S. Navy, which was recruiting a crew for Chesapeake, then at the Washington Navy Yard outfitting for a voyage to the Mediterranean.

Vice-Admiral Sir George Berkeley dispatched his flagship, the fourth-rate warship , with written orders authorizing him to board and search the United States warship to recover any deserters.

Attack and search

Chesapeake was off the coast of Norfolk, Virginia, commanded by Commodore James Barron, when Leopard, under Captain Salusbury Pryce Humphreys, encountered and hailed her. Barron was not alarmed, and received Lieutenant John Meade on board, who presented Barron with the search warrant. After an inconclusive discussion, Meade returned to Leopard. Captain Humphreys, using a hailing trumpet, ordered the American ship to submit. When Chesapeake did not, Humphreys fired a round across her bow. This was followed immediately by Leopard firing broadsides into the American ship. Her guns unloaded and her decks cluttered with stores in preparation for a long cruise, Chesapeake managed to fire only a single gun in reply. The humiliated Barron struck his colors and surrendered. Three of Chesapeakes crew had been killed and 18 wounded, including Barron, by the attack. However, Humphreys refused the surrender and sent a boarding party to Chesapeake to search for deserters.

Only Ratford was British-born. The others were American residents, but had been serving on British warships. Prior to serving on Chesapeake, Martin served on the merchant vessel Caledonia and was described as "a colored man." Newspaper accounts of the time state Martin was not born in the United States but brought to Massachusetts, (possibly enslaved) when he was six years old by mariner William Howland, from Buenos Aires.

The brig  brought the first dispatches to Halifax in early July. Leopard followed with her prisoners for trial. Jenkin Ratford, the sole British citizen, was sentenced to death and was hanged from the yardarm of Halifax on August 31, 1807. The three American deserters received sentences of 500 lashes each, but the sentences were later commuted.

The bloody encounter caused a storm of protest from the U.S. government, and the British government eventually offered to return the three American residents and to pay reparations for the damage to Chesapeake. After over 5 years spent in bonded service with the Royal Navy, the last two deserters were returned to Boston, Massachusetts by the schooner , one month after the outbreak of the War of 1812.

Aftermath

The incident outraged American public opinion, and many felt the country's "sense of honor" had been violated. Americans of every political stripe spoke of the need to uphold national honor, and to reject the dismissal of the United States by Britain as a third-class nonentity. Americans talked incessantly about the need for force in response. President Thomas Jefferson noted: "Never since the Battle of Lexington have I seen this country in such a state of exasperation as at present, and even that did not produce such unanimity." James Monroe, then a foreign minister acting under instructions from U.S. Secretary of State James Madison, demanded British disavowal of the deed, the restoration of the four seamen, the recall of Admiral Berkeley, the exclusion of British warships from U.S. territorial waters, and the abolition of impressments from vessels under the United States flag.

The event raised tensions between the two countries and, while possibly not a direct cause, was one of the events leading up to the War of 1812. Many Americans demanded war because of the attack, but President Jefferson turned to diplomacy and economic pressure in the form of the ill-fated Embargo Act of 1807.

The Federal government began to be concerned about the lack of war material. Their concerns led to the establishment of a tariff protecting the manufacturers of gunpowder, which helped ensure the fortunes of the DuPont company.

The incident had significant repercussions for the U.S. Navy. The public was shocked that Chesapeake had not been able to put up any resistance and surrendered so quickly, questioning the ability of the Navy to defend the country in the case of a war with Great Britain, despite the expensive and controversial frigate-building program. A court-martial blamed Barron and suspended him from service for five years as punishment.

In 1820, Commodore Barron challenged and mortally wounded Commodore Stephen Decatur in a duel over remarks Decatur had made about Barron's conduct in 1807 (Barron was also wounded). Decatur had served on the court-martial that found Barron guilty of being unprepared and barred him from command for five years.

Chesapeake herself was captured during the War of 1812, when on June 1, 1813, after a series of naval engagements with the Royal Navy, the British frigate  captured Chesapeake in a single-ship action near Boston. The Royal Navy commissioned Chesapeake, but put her up for sale at Portsmouth in July 1819. Her timbers are now part of the Chesapeake Mill in Wickham, England.

In fiction
The fallout from the Chesapeake–Leopard affair features prominently in two novels of the Aubrey–Maturin series by Patrick O'Brian. It is first mentioned in the fifth novel, Desolation Island, when the fictional Captain Jack Aubrey is given command of Leopard (which he privately refers to as the "horrible old Leopard") a few years after the incident. Though the United States and Great Britain are at peace at the time, and neither he nor any member of his crew had any direct involvement with the affair, he is met with mistrust and hostility from American whalers due to their negative association with the ship. The subsequent capture of Chesapeake during the War of 1812 features prominently in the sixth Aubrey–Maturin novel, The Fortune of War, as Aubrey is aboard  during the engagement.

The Chesapeake–Leopard affair is mentioned in the Boston Jacky novel of the Bloody Jack adventures series by L.A. Meyer.

See also
Little Belt affair
Bibliography of early United States naval history

References

Bibliography

Ivie, Robert L. "The metaphor of force in prowar discourse: The case of 1812." Quarterly Journal of Speech 68#3 (1982) pp. 240–253.

Risjord, Norman K. "1812: Conservatives, War Hawks and the Nation's Honor." William and Mary Quarterly: A Magazine of Early American History (1961): 196–210. in JSTOR

Further reading
 
 
 
  

 
 Gilje, Paul A. Free Trade and Sailors' Rights in the War of 1812 (Cambridge University Press, 2013)

External links
Journal of the Early Republic: Remembering the USS Chesapeake: The Politics of Maritime Death and Impressment by Robert E. Cray, Jr. (read via library card)
Abstract of Journal of the Early Republic: Remembering the USS Chesapeake: The Politics of Maritime Death and Impressment by Robert E. Cray, Jr. (full text via subscribing institution)
Norfolk Historical Society Account

1807 in the British Empire
1807 in the United States
United Kingdom–United States relations
International maritime incidents
War of 1812
Naval battles involving the United States
Naval battles involving Great Britain
Presidency of Thomas Jefferson
1807 in Virginia
Conflicts in 1807
June 1807 events
Combat incidents
Events that led to courts-martial